A simulacrum (plural: simulacra or simulacrums, from Latin simulacrum, which means "likeness, semblance") is a representation or imitation of a person or thing. The word was first recorded in the English language in the late 16th century, used to describe a representation, such as a statue or a painting, especially of a god. By the late 19th century, it had gathered a secondary association of inferiority: an image without the substance or qualities of the original. Literary critic Fredric Jameson offers photorealism as an example of artistic simulacrum, in which a painting is created by copying a photograph that is itself a copy of the real thing. Other art forms that play with simulacra include trompe-l'œil, pop art, Italian neorealism, and French New Wave.

Philosophy

Simulacra have long been of interest to philosophers. In his Sophist, Plato speaks of two kinds of image-making. The first is a faithful reproduction, attempted to copy precisely the original. The second is intentionally distorted in order to make the copy appear correct to viewers. He gives the example of Greek statuary, which was crafted larger on the top than on the bottom so that viewers on the ground would see it correctly. If they could view it in scale, they would realize it was malformed. This example from the visual arts serves as a metaphor for the philosophical arts and the tendency of some philosophers to distort the truth so that it appears accurate unless viewed from the proper angle. Nietzsche addresses the concept of simulacrum (but does not use the term) in the Twilight of the Idols, suggesting that most philosophers, by ignoring the reliable input of their senses and resorting to the constructs of language and reason, arrive at a distorted copy of reality.

French semiotician and social theorist Jean Baudrillard argues in Simulacra and Simulation that a simulacrum is not a copy of the real, but becomes truth in its own right: the hyperreal. According to Baudrillard, what the simulacrum copies either had no original or no longer has an original, since a simulacrum signifies something it is not, and therefore leaves the original unable to be located. Where Plato saw two types of representation—faithful and intentionally distorted (simulacrum)—Baudrillard sees four: (1) basic reflection of reality; (2) perversion of reality; (3) pretence of reality (where there is no model); and (4) simulacrum, which "bears no relation to any reality whatsoever". In Baudrillard's concept, like Nietzsche's, simulacra are perceived as negative, but another modern philosopher who addressed the topic, Gilles Deleuze, takes a different view, seeing simulacra as the avenue by which an accepted ideal or "privileged position" could be "challenged and overturned". Deleuze defines simulacra as "those systems in which different relates to different by means of difference itself. What is essential is that we find in these systems no prior identity, no internal resemblance".

Alain Badiou, in speaking with reference to Nazism about Evil, writes, "fidelity to a simulacrum, unlike fidelity to an event, regulates its break with the situation not by the universality of the void, but by the closed particularity of an abstract set ... (the 'Germans' or the 'Aryans')".

Recreation
Recreational simulacra include reenactments of historical events or replicas of landmarks, such as Colonial Williamsburg and the Eiffel Tower, and constructions of fictional or cultural ideas, such as Fantasyland at The Walt Disney Company's Magic Kingdom. The various Disney parks have been regarded as the ultimate recreational simulacra by some philosophers, with Baudrillard noting that Walt Disney World Resort is a copy of a copy, or "a simulacrum to the second power". In 1975, Italian author Umberto Eco argued that at Disney's parks, "we not only enjoy a perfect imitation, we also enjoy the conviction that imitation has reached its apex and afterwards reality will always be inferior to it". Examining the impact of Disney's simulacrum of national parks, Disney's Wilderness Lodge, environmentalist Jennifer Cypher and anthropologist Eric Higgs expressed worry that "the boundary between artificiality and reality will become so thin that the artificial will become the centre of moral value". Eco also refers to commentary on watching sports as sports to the power of three, or sports cubed. First, there are the players who participate in the sport (the real), then the onlookers merely witnessing it, and finally the commentary on the act of witnessing the sport. Visual artist Paul McCarthy has created entire installations based on Pirates of the Caribbean and theme park simulacra, with videos playing inside the installation.

Caricature
An interesting example of simulacrum is caricature. When an artist produces a line drawing that closely approximates the facial features of a real person, the subject of the sketch cannot be easily identified by a random observer; it can be taken for a likeness of any individual. However, a caricaturist exaggerates prominent facial features, and a viewer will pick up on these features and be able to identify the subject, even though the caricature bears far less actual resemblance to the subject.

Iconography
Beer (1999: p. 11) employs the term "simulacrum" to denote the formation of a sign or iconographic image, whether iconic or aniconic, in the landscape or greater field of Thangka art and Tantric Buddhist iconography. For example, an iconographic representation of a cloud formation sheltering a deity in a thanka or covering the auspice of a sacred mountain in the natural environment may be discerned as a simulacrum of an "auspicious canopy" (Sanskrit: Chhatra) of the Ashtamangala. Perceptions of religious imagery in natural phenomena approach a cultural universal and may be proffered as evidence of the natural creative spiritual engagement of the experienced environment endemic to the human psychology.

As artificial beings
Simulacra often appear in speculative fiction. Examples of simulacra in the sense of artificial or supernaturally or scientifically created artificial life forms include:

 Automaton – A self-operating robot.
 Androids created to pass for human beings in several of Philip K. Dick's novels (called "simulacra" in We Can Build You, The Simulacra, Now Wait for Last Year, Clans of the Alphane Moon, The Penultimate Truth and "replicants" in Do Androids Dream of Electric Sheep? and its film adaptation Blade Runner).
 Carlo Collodi's Pinocchio – A puppet that comes to life.
 Feathertop – A scarecrow created and brought to life by a witch.
 Frankenstein's Monster from Frankenstein – A creation of Victor Frankenstein made from various body parts. Frankenstein's Monster was also adapted in DC Comics and Marvel Comics.
 The Universal Pictures film Bride of Frankenstein featured the titular monster that was made by a collaboration of Henry Frankenstein and Doctor Septimus Pretorius.
 Fritz Lang's Metropolis – Featuring "Maria" the robotrix.
 Galatea from Metamorphoses – A statue of a female created by Pygmalion and brought to life by Aphrodite.
 Gargoyles – Statues sculpted to resemble monsters.
 Hatsune Miku and other Vocaloids.
 Holograms – Computerized images of anything.
 Homunculus – Small miniature humanoids created through alchemy.
 Karel Čapek's RUR – Originated the word robot.
 Neutrinos from Solaris – A race of creatures made from the memories of humans.
 Nomu – Creatures from My Hero Academia. Also known as "Artificial Humans", the Nomu are deceased humans whose bodies were altered and modified by Dr. Kyudai Garaki to hold more than one Quirk. These mindless creations are used by the League of Villains and later its extended counterpart the Paranormal Liberation Front.
 Pintosmalto – A statue of a man-made from large amounts of sugar and sweet almonds, scented water, musk and amber, various jewels, gold thread, and above all a trough and a silver trowel who was brought to life by a Goddess of Love.
 Realm of the Mad God has several enemies stated to be simulacrums in-universe. Most notably, the incarnation of Oryx the Mad God that the player fights in Oryx's Chamber is explicitly stated by Oryx to not be his real form. In addition, the versions of various bosses fought in the "Mad God Mayhem" dungeon are all stated to be simulacrums, and the version of Dr. Terrible fought in the Mad Lab is stated to be a simulacrum in additional media.
 Robots
 Simulacrum Soldier – Robotic soldiers with human minds employed by both the IMC and Frontier Militia in the Titanfall universe. While they bear a superficial resemblance to the commonly-fielded BRD-01 Spectre, Simulacra are instead human minds uploaded into robotic bodies. A simulacrum can be considered a form of transhumanism.
 Revenant – An example from its spinoff, Apex Legends, a playable Legend who possesses a mind of a former human hitman.
 Ash - Also an example, present in both Titanfall 2 and Apex Legends.
 Simulacrum Spell – An illusion spell from Dungeons & Dragons that creates a partially real duplicate of someone, though it only has half the power and abilities of the original.
 Snegurochka – A little girl made of snow.
 Squadron Supreme of America - In Marvel Comics, the Squadron Supreme of America are revealed to be simulacrums created by Mephisto and programmed by the Power Elite so that Phil Coulson can have them be a United States-sponsored superhero team.
 Terracotta Army – Terracotta sculptures of the armies of Qin Shi Huang.
 The Gingerbread Man – A gingerbread man that came to life.
 The Golem of Jewish folklore – A creation of a rabbi made from clay that was harvested from the banks of the Vlatva.
 Thumbelina – A small girl created by a witch.
 Ushabti – Egyptian figurines.
 Vasilisa the Beautiful – A doll that came to life.

Also, the illusions of absent loved ones created by an alien life form in Stanislaw Lem's Solaris can be considered simulacra.

Architecture
Architecture is a special form of simulacrum.

In his book Simulacra and Simulation, Jean Baudrillard describes the Beaubourg effect in which the Pompidou Centre functions as a monument of a mass simulation that absorbs and devours all the cultural energy from its surrounding areas. According to Baudrillard, the Centre Pompidou is "a machine for making emptiness".

An everyday use of the simulacrum are the false facades, used during renovations to hide and imitate the real architecture underneath it.

A Potemkin village is a simulation: a facade meant to fool the viewer into thinking that he or she is seeing the real thing. The concept is used in the Russian-speaking world as well as in English and in other languages. Potemkin village belongs to a genus of phenomena that proliferated in post-Soviet space. Those phenomena describe gaps between external appearances and underlying realities.

Disneyland – Disneyland is a perfect model of all the entangled orders of simulacra. [...] Play of illusions and phantasms.

Las Vegas – the absolute advertising city (of the 1950s, of the crazy years of advertising, which has retained the charm of that era.)

See also
 Memetics
 Simulacra and Simulation
 Simulated reality
 Metaverse

References

External links

 "Two Essays: Simulacra and Science Fiction; Ballard’s Crash" Baudrillard, Jean
 "The Simulacrum's Revenge," sec 3.2 of Flatline Constructs: Gothic and Cybernetic-Theory Fiction Fisher, Mark

16th-century neologisms
Forteana
Magic (supernatural)
Postmodern art
Hyperreality
Continental philosophy
Perception
Visual arts theory